Nathan Ingham (born 27 June 1993) is a Canadian professional soccer player who plays as a goalkeeper for Atlético Ottawa.

Club career

Early career
Ingham began studying at the Florida Gulf Coast University in 2011, having graduated from Keswick High School in Ontario, Canada. He was named team captain during his sophomore, junior and senior years at Keswick, where he earned multiple MVP awards. He also captained the school's volleyball team and won bronze and gold medals in his sophomore and senior years respectively in regional high-jump. In 2011, Ingham kept one clean sheet in 8 games and was named A-Sun Tournament MVP.

Ingham played every game for the Eagles in 2012, recording a program-record nine shutouts. After playing four games in 2013, Ingham suffered a season-ending injury.

In 2014, Ingham was named to the Atlantic Sun All-Conference First Team and All-Tournament Team, as well as being named A-Sun Tournament MVP for a second time after not allowing a goal during the championship. That season he recorded another nine shutouts, matching his previous Florida Gulf Coast record from 2012 and tying the Eagles' career all-time record of 19. That season, Ingham did not concede more than two goals in any game and led the A-Sun Conference in goals against average (0.71), save percentage (.821) and saves (69). At one point in the season, Ingham held a shutout streak of 495 minutes and 40 seconds, spanning six games and four straight clean sheets.

In 2015, Ingham was named to the A-Sun First Team and was also named Atlantic Sun Goalkeeper of the Year. He posted seven shutouts in twelve appearances, conceding only nine goals all season.

K–W United
In 2015, he played for Ontario-based Kitchener-Waterloo United, where he won the 2015 Premier Development League and won yet another MVP award after saving a penalty in the playoff final against the New York Red Bulls U-23. He returned to the Eagles for his senior year, in which he was named Atlantic Sun Goalkeeper of the Year and became a six-time Atlantic Sun Defensive Player of the Week - a joint record.

FC Edmonton
Having graduated as the program's all-time goals-against average leader, and one of only two goalkeepers in the history of the A-Sun to finish with a goals-against average lower than 1.00, Ingham signed with professional NASL side FC Edmonton.

After failing to earn a first-team place with the Edmonton based team, Ingham joined the second team of Toronto FC on loan in 2016. He made 2 appearances for The Reds in the USL, being named man of the match in his first match in a losing effort against New York Red Bull II and only making a cameo appearance in his second match, coming in late for a recovering Clint Irwin before returning to Edmonton.

Ingham would find success in his second year at FC Edmonton earning the starting spot on June 7 against the New York Cosmos making 5 saves, including a penalty save to secure his first professional win.  He retained the number 1 spot playing 6 matches in the month of June being named to the NASL Team of the Week following his first 2 starts against the aforementioned New York Cosmos before making another 6 saves and being named man of the match against Miami FC on June 10 in a 1-0 loss. Ingham would go on to be named man of the match in his next 2 starts during a home and home with the 2017 NASL Champion, San Francisco Deltas; he was also nominated for the NASL play of the week for his top corner save that took place late in the second half of the June 17th match before earning NASL's play of the week honor for his "triple save" in the later of the two matches on June 24. Ingham earned NASL team of the month honours for the month of June after being named to the NASL team of the week for the second time in June.

On July 7 Ingham was sidelined with an injury during a match against North Carolina FC keeping him out of the line-up until the start of the fall season. He was left out of the 18 man roster after that for nearly a month with speculation of FC Edmonton selling Ingham to interested suitors; although nothing materialized. Ingham played 2 matches at the end of the season against the Jacksonville Armada and Puerto Rico FC, logging a tie and a loss respectively. He spent two seasons with FC Edmonton, before the club ceased operations after the 2017 season.

Pittsburgh Riverhounds
After playing with PDL club Calgary Foothills during the 2018 PDL season, Ingham would sign with Pittsburgh Riverhounds SC of USL in July 2018.

York United
On 8 April 2019, Ingham signed with Canadian Premier League side York9 (later renamed York United). On 27 April 2019 he made his debut for York9, conceding one goal in a 1-1 draw against Forge FC in Hamilton. Despite Matt Silva being the club's presumed starter before the season began, Ingham quickly secured the starting goalkeeper spot and wound up playing in all but two games for York9 in their 2019 season as they finished in third place overall. Ingham was one of three goalkeepers nominated for the 2019 CPL Golden Glove and was also named to the 2019 Spring Season Best XI.

Atlético Ottawa
On January 26, 2022, Ingham signed a two-year contract with Atlético Ottawa.

International career
In November 2012, Ingham received his first Canadian youth national team call-up for an U-20 preparation camp. The following November was called in again for a Florida/Costa Arica camp and was subsequently named to Canada’s 30 man preliminary roster. However was not named in the 23 man 2013 CONCACAF U-20 Championship.

Honours

Atlético Ottawa 
 Canadian Premier League
Regular Season: 2022

Career statistics

References

External links
 
 

1993 births
Living people
Association football goalkeepers
Canadian soccer players
Soccer people from Ontario
People from Georgina, Ontario
Sportspeople from Newmarket, Ontario
Canadian expatriate soccer players
Expatriate soccer players in the United States
Canadian expatriate sportspeople in the United States
Florida Gulf Coast Eagles men's soccer players
K-W United FC players
FC Edmonton players
Toronto FC II players
Calgary Foothills FC players
Pittsburgh Riverhounds SC players
York United FC players
Atlético Ottawa players
USL League Two players
North American Soccer League players
USL Championship players
Canadian Premier League players